Bridge 5, also known as the Glendale Bridge, is a vertical lift bridge carrying Glendale Avenue (Regional Rd. 89) over the Welland Canal in St. Catharines, Ontario. Completed and opened to traffic in September 1928 during construction of the 4th canal, this bridge is one of three remaining lift bridges of its kind on the canal.

Welland Canal
Vertical lift bridges in Canada